Emiti Bi Prema Hue is a 2012 Oriya romantic drama film directed by Nishikant Dalabehera. Sabyasachi Mishra, Riya Dey and Mihir Das played the lead cast. The film released on 10 February 2012.

Synopsis
Surya Prakash is a mafia don leaves with wife Suchitra and assistant Kiran. When his daughter Shibani is born, to engage himself, he keeps Kiran's son Amar as her associate. Gradually the time come when  Amar and Shibani are fall in love with each other. When Surya know the fact, he tires to kill Amar. By knowing this Shibani attempts to suicide. Later Surya realizes his fault and Amar and Shibani unites.

Cast
 Sabyasachi Mishra	... 	Amar
 Riya Dey	... 	Shibani
 Mihir Das	... 	Surya Pratap
 Aparajita Mohanty	... 	Suchitra
 Asrumochan Mohanty	... 	Kiran
 Jairam Samal	... 	School teacher
 Hadu	... Shubani's uncle
 Lovely ... item song dancer
 Choudhury Jaiprakash Das  ...Hotel owner

Soundtrack

The audio release function of the movie is held at Hotel Presidency, Bhubaneswar. The music for the movie was composed by Prashant Padhi.

Box office
The film fail to impress the box office and did average business.

Awards

  24th Orissa State Film Awards
 Best Actor – Sabyasachi Mishra
 Best Actor in supporting role – Ashrumochan Mohanty
 Best Child Actor - Aryan Misra
 Special Jury Award -Mihir Das

References

External links
 

2012 films
2010s Odia-language films
2012 romantic drama films
Indian romantic drama films